Poughkeepsie, officially the Town of Poughkeepsie, is a town in Dutchess County, New York, United States. As of the 2020 United States Census, the population was 45,471. The name is derived from the native term Uppuqui meaning "lodge-covered", plus ipis meaning "little water", plus ing meaning "place", all of which translates to "the reed-covered lodge by the little water place", or Uppuqui-ipis-ing. This later evolved into Apokeepsing, then into Poughkeepsing, and finally Poughkeepsie.

The area includes a large IBM campus noted for its ongoing development and manufacturing of IBM mainframes.

History

The town was first settled circa 1780 and was part of the Schuyler Patent of 1788. The town of Poughkeepsie was established in 1788 as part of a general organization of towns in the county. In 1854, part of the western section of the town, already an independent village, became the city of Poughkeepsie. At least two National Historic Landmarks are located in the town: the Vassar College Observatory and the Main Building of Vassar College.

Education

Vassar College, Dutchess Community College, and Marist College are located in the town of Poughkeepsie.

Our Lady of Lourdes High School is a private, co-educational, Catholic high school located at a former IBM site on Boardman Road.

Poughkeepsie Day School is an independent, co-educational, day school for students from pre-kindergarten (3 years) through grade 12, located at another former IBM site on Boardman Road.

Oakwood Friends School is a private, co-educational middle school and high school located near the western end of State Route 113 (Spackenkill Road).

There are several school districts in the immediate area, such as Poughkeepsie city; the town itself has Arlington's, Spackenkill's, and parts of Wappinger's and Hyde Park's districts. The first Arlington High School was in Poughkeepsie before being moved to the more rural Lagrangeville.

Geography

The Hudson River, which marks the boundary of the Ulster County towns of Lloyd and Marlborough and the Orange County town of Newburgh, forms the majority of the western border of the town. The city of Poughkeepsie occupies the remainder of the town's western border. The town is bordered by Hyde Park to the north, Pleasant Valley to the northeast, LaGrange to the east, and Wappinger to the southeast.

U.S. Route 9, U.S. Route 44 and State Route 55 pass through the town.

Government and emergency services

Government

The town of Poughkeepsie operates under a council–manager form of government. The Town Supervisor is the chief administrative officer of the town and village, selected to carry out the directives of the council. The Deputy Supervisor monitors the town's fiscal condition and enforces its ordinances and laws. The Town Supervisor is also involved in the discussion of all matters coming before council yet has no final vote. The Town Board is the legislative body consisting of the Town Supervisor and five council members. The Town Supervisor serves as the presiding officer of the council. The council functions to set policy, approve the annual budget and enact local laws, resolutions and ordinances. The Town Supervisor and Town Clerk are elected officials, as are the Town Council members from the six wards of the town.

Fire
Three fire departments cover the town of Poughkeepsie: the Arlington Fire District covers most of the town, from the southern end to the LaGrange line, from the city line north, the Fairview Fire Department covers a small  section in the northern section of the town near Saint Francis Hospital, and the New Hamburg Fire Department covers the south end. The fire districts operate a total of seven fire stations spread out over the town, as their district covers a very large area. The departments are capable of handling fires, rescues, extrications and natural disasters. The departments operate a varied fire apparatus fleet, along with basic life support and advanced life support emergency medical services (EMS) within the Arlington Fire District. Within the Fairview section, Mobile Life Support Services is contracted to handle advanced life support calls. All EMS transports in the New Hamburg Fire District are covered by Mobile Life Support Services through a contract with the town of Poughkeepsie.

Police
Police protection is provided by the Town of Poughkeepsie Police Department. When someone calls 911, the call is routed to the Dutchess 911 center in the town of Poughkeepsie, and they route it to the town police department's communications center, who then dispatch the closest unit(s) based on a GPS map.

Medical
The Mid-Hudson Regional Hospital of Westchester Medical Center is located in the town, and Vassar Brothers Medical Center is located a mile away in the city of Poughkeepsie.

Demographics

As of the census of 2000, there were 42,777 people, 14,605 households, and 10,121 families residing in the town. The population density was 1,487.5 people per square mile (574.3/km2).  There were 15,132 housing units at an average density of 526.2 per square mile (203.1/km2). The racial makeup of the town was 63.01% White, 38.07% Black or African American, 0.14% Native American, 5.13% Asian, 0.02% Pacific Islander, 1.62% from other races, and 2.00% from two or more races. Hispanic or Latino of any race were 5.27% of the population. 

There were 14,605 households, out of which 32.9% had children under the age of 18 living with them, 55.8% were married couples living together, 9.6% had a female householder with no husband present, and 30.7% were non-families. 25.0% of all households were made up of individuals, and 9.6% had someone living alone who was 65 years of age or older.  The average household size was 2.57 and the average family size was 3.10.

In the town, the population was spread out, with 22.6% under the age of 18, 16.9% from 18 to 24, 26.4% from 25 to 44, 21.3% from 45 to 64, and 12.9% who were 65 years of age or older. The median age was 35 years. For every 100 females, there were 91.8 males. For every 100 females age 18 and over, there were 88.3 males.

The median income for a household in the town was $55,327, and the median income for a family was $65,258. Males had a median income of $46,701 versus $31,005 for females. The per capita income for the town was $23,589. About 3.3% of families and 5.7% of the population were below the poverty line, including 5.6% of those under age 18 and 5.0% of those age 65 or over.

Transportation

Rail

Amtrak, the national passenger rail system, provides regular service to Poughkeepsie city. Poughkeepsie also has commuter rail service via the Hudson Line (Metro-North).

Bus
Dutchess County Public Transit bus system provides service throughout the town.

Communities and locations in or near the town of Poughkeepsie

Arlington – A suburb that is located in the town, east of the city line. The Arlington Central School District takes its name from the area.
Barnegat – A location in the southwestern part of the town.
Colonial Heights – A hamlet west of Rochdale.
Clark Heights – A location at the northeastern town line in Pleasant Valley. (Home of the Boy)
Crown Heights – A hamlet on the western side of the town.
Fairview – A community in the northern part of the town that borders the northern city line.
MacDonnell Heights – A hamlet southwest of Rochdale.
New Hamburg – A small hamlet along the Hudson River that is home to a popular marina and a busy Metro-North train station. Adjacent to Wappingers Falls, the hamlet is the southwesternmost point in the town.
Poughkeepsie – The town of Poughkeepsie wraps around the city of Poughkeepsie in a crescent shape.
Red Oaks Mill - A suburb located southeast of the city. The area borders Spackenkill on the east and centers on the intersection of Vassar Road (Dutchess County 77), Spackenkill Road (New York State Route 113) and New Hackensack Road (New York State Route 376). A small, residential side street also feeds into the intersection.
Rochdale – A hamlet by the eastern town line, sandwiched between Arlington and Pleasant Valley.
Rudco – Once a small parcel of farmland before World War II, it was purchased in 1942 by IBM to expand upon.
Spackenkill – Hamlet located in the town occupies the area south of the city line, including the Hagantown and Kingwood Park neighborhoods. The Spackenkill Union Free School District takes its name from the area. An IBM plant is also located in the area, and many of its employees live in Spackenkill.
Van Keurens – Hamlet; this land is mostly taken over by the Clinton Point Quarry, owned by Tilcon, Inc.
Wappingers Falls – A small part of the Village of Wappingers Falls is in the southern part of the town.

Notable people
 Bill Duke, actor
 Taylor Jardine, lead singer for We Are The In Crowd
 Jeh Johnson, United States Secretary of Homeland Security (Cottam Hill)
 Johnny Miller, pioneering aviator, brother of Lee Miller
 Lee Miller, Vogue photographer and World War II correspondent
 Samuel Morse, American painter who turned inventor
 Matthew Vassar of England, who died at his namesake Vassar College

See also

Arlington Fire District
National Register of Historic Places listings in Poughkeepsie, New York

References

External links
 Town of Poughkeepsie official website
 Poughkeepsie Public Library District
 Town information
 Poughkeepsie-New Yorker article about the acquiring of Rudco by IBM
 Macaroni Kid Poughkeepsie - Family friendly events 

 
New York (state) populated places on the Hudson River
Towns in Dutchess County, New York